The canton of Ussel is an administrative division of the Corrèze department, south-central France. It was created at the French canton reorganisation which came into effect in March 2015. Its seat is in Ussel.

It consists of the following communes:
 
Aix
Couffy-sur-Sarsonne
Courteix
Eygurande
Feyt
Lamazière-Haute
Laroche-près-Feyt
Merlines
Monestier-Merlines
Saint-Pardoux-le-Neuf
Ussel

References

Cantons of Corrèze